Heteroglenea glechoma is a species of beetle in the family Cerambycidae. It was described by Francis Polkinghorne Pascoe in 1867, originally under the genus Glenea. It is known from Papua New Guinea, Japan, the Solomon Islands, Moluccas, the Philippines, Java, Taiwan, and Sumatra.

References

Saperdini
Beetles described in 1867